Aso Rock is a large outcrop of granitic rock located on the outskirts of Abuja, the capital of Nigeria. It is one of the city's most noticeable features. The Nigerian Presidential Complex, Nigerian National Assembly, and Nigerian Supreme Court are located around it. Much of the city extends to the south of the rock. "Aso" means victorious in the native language of the Asokoro ("the people of victory") ethnic group.

Aso Rock was the site of the 2003 Aso Rock Declaration, issued by Heads of Government of the Commonwealth during the CHOGM held in Abuja.  It reaffirmed the Commonwealth's principles as detailed under the Harare Declaration, but set the "promotion of democracy and development" as the organisation's priorities.

See also
 Zuma Rock

Footnotes

Abuja
Natural monoliths
Rock formations of Nigeria
Geology of Nigeria
Landmarks in Nigeria